The American Journal of Reproductive Immunology is a monthly peer-reviewed medical journal covering reproductive biology and immunology. It was established in 1980 under its current name. From 1985 to 1988 it was published under the name American Journal of Reproductive Immunology and Microbiology. It is the official journal of the American Society for Reproductive Immunology. It is published by Wiley-Blackwell and the editor-in-chief is Gil Mor (Yale University School of Medicine). According to the Journal Citation Reports, the journal has a 2013 impact factor of 2.668.

References

External links

Immunology journals
Wiley-Blackwell academic journals
Monthly journals
Publications established in 1980
English-language journals